Buloqboshi is a district of Andijan Region in Uzbekistan. The capital lies at Buloqboshi.

The district consists of 4 urban-type settlements (Buloqboshi, Andijon, Uchtepa and Shirmonbuloq) and 5 rural communities.

References

Districts of Uzbekistan
Andijan Region